Johannesteijsmannia altifrons is a species of flowering plant in the palm family. It is native to southern Thailand, Peninsular Malaysia, Borneo, and Sumatra. Flowers of this species smell of sour milk.

References

External links
 
 

altifrons
Taxa named by Heinrich Zollinger
Taxa named by Heinrich Gustav Reichenbach
Taxa named by Harold E. Moore